Mother India  is a 1992 Telugu-language drama film produced by T. Diwakar Rao under the D.D.R. Productions banner and directed by B. V. Ramana Reddy. It starrs Jagapati Babu, Sharada, Sindhuja  and music composed by Chakravarthy.

Plot
The film begins with the 1960’s Government Land Ceiling Act. Being cognizant of it a venomous squire Duryodhana Rao purports his 200 acres under the Benami of men suppressed under his toe. He also notifies his mate Jaganatham who sneaky sells his land to his sibling Rajyalakshmi and migrates to the city. After a while, the hoodwink breaks, hitherto it is too late. Rajyalakshmi's family loses most as a result, her husband Krishna Murthy becomes a wanderer. Therefrom, Rajyalakshmi strives hard for survival and rearing 3 infant kids by cultivating the left-over land. Spotting it, the younger one Sivaji supports his mother by quitting his education. Years roll by, and Rajyalakshmi & Shivaji toil and molds the elder Ashok as an IAS, but he turns self-centered. Presently, Jaganatham reached the top as MP. Regardless, he is still tyrannizing the farmers by mingling with Duryodhana Rao and his wife Mahakaali. They play by failing to obtain the farmer’s prime cost of crop and trample the daily laborers. 

Rajyalakshmi & Shivaji continuously fights and struggles for their communal rights by uniting a labor union leader Bheemudu. Once, they extract a sham of Duryodhana Rao & Mahakaali and forcibly return the swindled amount obtained from the bank on behalf of unknown races. So, the malefactors' gambit creates a rift between farmers & laborers but in vain. Meanwhile, Ashok backs as a Collector who has been snared by Jaganatham by knitting his daughter against his mother when she severs from him. After that, the yearly crop thrives and farmers decide to avoid intermediator & dealers. Accordingly, they store the stock which is escorted by Bheemudu. Wherefore, Duryodhana Rao ruses, and his son Bullabbai fires it. Next, they incriminate and haul Bheemudu to Panchayat where they attempt to burn him alive but he is safeguarded by Rajyalakshmi & Shivaji. 

Next, Shivaji warns Duryodhana Rao to pay back the cost of the crop within 24 hours. Otherwise, his son Bullabbai will be slain. To abscond from it, Duryodhana Rao makes a foul play under the guidance of Jaganatham. They attribute an illicit relationship to Rajyalakshmi’s daughter Sudha with his nephew Suribabu. However, Shivaji falls them apart with aid of Bheemudu and recovers the amount. At this time, enraged knaves’ sharp practice of distributing fake seeds & fertilizers which devastates the yield, and lose-hearted farmers commit suicide. Plus, they hound the bankers to settle the arrears taken when Rajyalakshmi impedes Then, Jagannath arouses the collector Ashok anti to them when a blazing row occurs which entails the encounter and death of an innocent. Now livid Rajyalakshmi begins a movement and charges the government which ignites the country. Thus, the government bows its head down, accepts the defeat, and dethrones Jaganatham. Hence, the devils conspire for the mass murder of the village, and in that clash, Rajyalakshmi is shot dead. At last, Ashok also reforms and ceases the baddies with Shivaji. Finally, the movie ends with Rajyalakshmi proclaiming before leaving her breath that This struggle continues forever until the formation of a Peasant State.

Cast
Jagapati Babu as Shivaji
Sharada as Rajyalakshmi
Sindhuja 
Kota Srinivasa Rao as Jaganatham
Paruchuri Gopala Krishna as Bheemudu
Chalapathi Rao as Duryodhana Rao
Vijayalalitha as Mahakaali
Sai Kumar as Collector Ashok
Brahmanandam as Jacket Jorge
Sudhakar as Bullabbai
Brahmaji as Suribabu
Raghunath Reddy as Rajyalakshmi's younger brother
Mada Venkateswara Rao as Paper Subba Rao
Vidyasagar as Krishna Murthy

Soundtrack

The music for the film was composed by K. Chakravarthy and the lyrics were written by Jaladi. The soundtrack was released by the Lahari Music company.

References

1992 films
1990s Telugu-language films
Films scored by K. Chakravarthy